Evžen Rošický (15 October 1914 Olomouc – 25 June 1942 Prague) was a Czech athlete and journalist. Prague's Stadion Evžena Rošického is named after him. During World War II, he and his father Jaroslav Rošický were part of the anti-Nazi resistance group Captain Nemo. Evžen Rošický and his father were arrested on 18 June 1942, and one week later, on 25 June 1942, they were both executed at the Kobylisy shooting range in Prague.

References

1914 births
1942 deaths
Sportspeople from Olomouc
People from the Margraviate of Moravia
Czech journalists
Athletes (track and field) at the 1936 Summer Olympics
Resistance members killed by Nazi Germany
Olympic athletes of Czechoslovakia
People executed at Kobylisy shooting range
20th-century journalists
Czechoslovak civilians killed in World War II